WHLG (101.3 FM) is a radio station broadcasting a Contemporary Christian format, licensed to Port St. Lucie, Florida.  The station serves the Treasure Coast from Vero Beach to North Palm Beach and is Radio Training Network, Inc.

Horizon Broadcasting reached a deal in May 2021, to sell WHLG and WTSM near Tallahassee to Radio Training Network, which owns The Joy FM regional network of Christian Contemporary radio stations, for $1.3 million. The sale was consummated on August 31, 2021.

On September 1, 2021, WHLG changed their format from adult contemporary to contemporary Christian, branded as "The Joy FM".

References

External links

HLG
Port St. Lucie, Florida
Radio stations established in 1998
1998 establishments in Florida
Contemporary Christian radio stations in the United States